This article provides information on candidates who stood for the 1969 Australian federal election. The election was held on 25 October 1969.

Redistributions and seat changes
Redistributions of electoral boundaries occurred in all states.
In New South Wales, six seats were abolished: the Labor-held seats of Dalley, East Sydney, Watson and West Sydney; the Liberal-held seat of Parkes; and the Country-held seat of Lawson. Five new seats were created: the notionally Labor seats of Chifley, Prospect and Sydney; and the notionally Liberal seats of Berowra and Cook. The Liberal-held seat of Hughes became notionally Labor.
The member for Hughes, Don Dobie (Liberal), contested Cook.
The member for Parkes, Tom Hughes (Liberal), contested Berowra.
The member for Watson, Jim Cope (Labor), contested Sydney.
In Victoria, the Labor-held seat of Darebin was renamed Scullin and the Liberal-held seat of Higinbotham was renamed Hotham. The Liberal-held seats of Fawkner and Isaacs and the Labor-held seats of (the pre-existing) Scullin and Yarra were abolished. A new, Liberal-held seat of Isaacs, unconnected to the previous one, was created. Four other new seats were also created: the Labor-held seats of Burke and Holt and the Liberal-held seats of Casey and Diamond Valley. The Liberal-held seat of Lalor and the Independent-held seat of Batman became notionally Labor, and the Labor-held seat of Melbourne Ports became notionally Liberal.
The member for Fawkner, Peter Howson (Liberal), contested Casey.
The member for Higinbotham, Don Chipp (Liberal), contested Hotham.
The member for Lalor, Mervyn Lee (Liberal), contested Bendigo.
The member for Yarra, Jim Cairns (Labor), contested Lalor.
In Queensland, the Labor-held seat of Brisbane became notionally Liberal, the Liberal-held seat of Herbert became notionally Labor, and the Labor-held seat of Wide Bay became notionally Country.
In Western Australia, the Labor-held seat of Stirling became notionally Liberal.
In South Australia, the notionally Liberal seat of Hawker was created.
There were minimal changes in Tasmania.

Retiring Members

Labor
 Joe Clark MP (Darling, NSW)
 Eric Costa MP (Banks, NSW)
 Frank Courtnay MP (Darebin, Vic)
 Dan Curtin MP (Kingsford-Smith, NSW)
 Len Devine MP (East Sydney, NSW)
 Jim Harrison MP (Blaxland, NSW)
 Dan Minogue MP (West Sydney, NSW)
 William O'Connor MP (Dalley, NSW)
 Ted Peters MP (Scullin, Vic)

Liberal
 Allen Fairhall MP (Paterson, NSW)
 Adrian Gibson MP (Denison, Tas)
 Sir William Haworth MP (Isaacs, Vic)

Country
 Laurie Failes MP (Lawson, NSW)

Independent
 Sam Benson MP (Batman, Vic)

House of Representatives
Sitting members at the time of the election are shown in bold text. Successful candidates are highlighted in the relevant colour. Where there is possible confusion, an asterisk (*) is also used.

Australian Capital Territory

New South Wales

Northern Territory

Queensland

South Australia

Tasmania

Victoria

Western Australia

Senate
Sitting Senators are shown in bold text. Tickets that elected at least one Senator are highlighted in the relevant colour. Successful candidates are identified by an asterisk (*).

South Australia
A special election was held in South Australia to fill the vacancy caused by the death of Liberal Senator Keith Laught. Martin Cameron, also of the Liberal Party, had been appointed to this vacancy in the interim.

Victoria
A special election was held in Victoria to fill the vacancy caused by the resignation of Liberal Senator John Gorton. Ivor Greenwood, also of the Liberal Party, had been appointed to this vacancy in the interim.

Summary by party 

Beside each party is the number of seats contested by that party in the House of Representatives for each state, as well as an indication of whether the party contested special Senate elections in Victoria and South Australia.

See also
 1969 Australian federal election
 Members of the Australian House of Representatives, 1966–1969
 Members of the Australian House of Representatives, 1969–1972
 List of political parties in Australia

References
Adam Carr's Election Archive - House of Representatives 1969
Adam Carr's Election Archive - Senate 1969

1969 in Australia
Candidates for Australian federal elections